Produce 48 is a 2018 South Korean competition television show on Mnet in which a girl group is formed from a large pool of South Korean and Japanese idols, most of whom are represented by major idol talent agencies such as AKB48 Group. The show starts with 96 contestants, with occasional rounds of competition and voting, some of which result in elimination from the contest. Of the 96 contestants, 57 of them are from South Korean management companies, and 39 of them are from Japanese idol groups, composed of current members of AKB48 and their sister groups. The final 12 contestants, with no nationality caps, as voted only by Korean viewers, will promote as a group for two and a half years.

Contestants
The spelling of names in English is according to the official website. The Korean contestants are presented in Eastern order (family name, given name), while the names of the Japanese contestants are presented in Western order (given name, family name) and also with their Japanese names. The age listed is according to the East Asian age reckoning. Episode rankings presented below are not accurate & episode 4 rankings are missing. 

Color key:

Contestants by ranking as shown below:

Group Battle Performances (Episode 3–4) 

Color key

Bold denotes the person who picked the team members. Sakura Miyawaki chose her team first, and 14 other captains were randomly selected to choose their members afterwards.

Position Evaluation Performances (Episode 6–7)

Each contestant chose to perform in either the Vocal/Rap or Dance position on a particular song, starting with Noe Yamada, who ranked #14 in the previous episode. The top 12 from the previous episode were then allowed to choose a filled group and replace the lowest-ranking contestant, forcing them to choose a mystery song for either Vocal/Rap (BoA's "Merry Chri") or Dance (Jax Jones's "Instruction"). The top contestant for each song received a 5,000 vote bonus, while the top contestant among all Vocal/Rap songs and the top contestant among all Dance songs received a 100,000 vote bonus.  For the Vocal/Rap position, final rankings of only several girls were shown. Also, the number of votes received by "Merry Chri" team members was not posted.

Color key

Concept Evaluation (Episode 9–10) 
The Concept Evaluation votes came from the studio audience. The winning team was the group that performed "Rollin' Rollin'"; they received a bonus of 20,000 votes each, with the top vote getter within the team, Miru Shiroma, receiving 50,000 votes.

Color key

Debut Evaluation Performances (Episode 12)

Color key

Notes

References

Produce 48 contestants
Produce 48 contestants
Lists of women
Lists of women in music